Following is a list of peaks in the Karnataka:

See also
 List of peaks in the Western Ghats
 List of Indian states and union territories by highest point

References

 
 
Karnataka-related lists